The Mountain State League was a minor league baseball league that played as a six–team league from 1937 to 1942. The league franchises were based in Kentucky and West Virginia. The Mountain State League was a Class D level league from 1937 to 1941 and Class C league in 1942.

Baseball Hall of Fame member Stan Musial played in the league for two seasons, as a member of the 1938 and 1939 Williamson Colts.

Cities represented 
Ashland, Kentucky: Ashland Colonels 1939–1942 
Beckley, West Virginia: Beckley Bengals 1937–1938 
Bluefield, West Virginia: Bluefield Blue-Grays 1937–1942 
Huntington, West Virginia: Huntington Boosters 1937; Huntington Bees 1938; Huntington Boosters 1939; Huntington Aces 1940–1941; Huntington Jewels 1942 
Logan, West Virginia: Logan Indians 1937–1942
Welch, West Virginia: Welch Miners 1937–1942 
Williamson, West Virginia: Williamson Colts 1937–1938; Williamson Red Birds 1939–1942

Standings & statistics
1937 Mountain State League
The Mountain State League began play in 1937 with six charter teams: the Beckley Bengals, based in Beckley, West Virginia; the Welch Miners, based in Welch, West Virginia; the Williamson Colts, based in Williamson, West Virginia; the Bluefield Blue-Grays, based in Bluefield, West Virginia; the Logan Indians based in Logan, West Virginia and the Huntington Boosters, based in Huntington, West Virginia. The Boosters withdrew from the league on August 1.

The league originally began with a split–season format, which was eventually abandoned on August 24.

The Beckley Bengals finished first in the regular season and won the league championship.

Huntington withdrew August 1; Welch withdrew September 3 during the playoff series with Williamson; Williamson withdrew September 6 during the finals. Playoffs: Beckley, bye; Welch 2 games, Bluefield 0; Williamson 2 games, Logan 0; Williamson 1 game, Welch 0  Finals: Beckley 2 games, Williamson 0.

1938 Mountain State League
All the teams from 1937 returned to the league in 1938. Huntington became known as the Huntington Bees.

The Logan Indians finished first in the regular season. However, they lost in the league finals to the Beckley Bengals, who repeated as league champions.

Stan Musial played for the Williamson Colts in 1938.
 Playoffs: Logan 3 games, Williamson 2; Beckley 2 games, Welch 0. Finals: Beckley 3 games, Logan 2.

1939 Mountain State League
1939 saw a few changes to the league. The Williamson Colts became the Williamson Red Birds, while the Huntington Bees became the Huntington Boosters again. The Beckley Bengals were replaced by the Ashland Colonels, based in Ashland, Kentucky.

The Williamson Red Birds finished first in the regular season. Williamson was defeated in the playoff finals by the Bluefield Blue–Grays.

Stan Musial played for the Williamson Red Birds in 1939.
  Playoffs: Williamson 2 games, Huntington 1; Bluefield 2 games, Welch 0. Finals: Bluefield 3 games, Williamson 1.

1940 Mountain State League
For the 1940 season, the Huntington Boosters became the Huntington Aces. The Williamson Red Birds finished first in the regular season and won the league championship.
 Playoffs: Logan 2 games, Welch 0; Williamson 2 games, Bluefield 0. Finals: Williamson 3 games, Logan 1.

1941 Mountain State League
The league played its final season as a Class D level league in 1941. All teams from 1940 returned. The Logan Indians finished first in the regular season and won the league championship.
 Playoffs: Logan 2 games, Bluefield 1; Welch 2 games, Williamson 0. Finals: Logan 4 games, Welch 1.

1942 Mountain State League
The league was a Class C level league in 1942. The Huntington team became the Huntington Jewels. Huntington finished first in the regular season and lost to the Ashland Colonels in the league finals.
 Playoffs: Ashland 2 games, Williamson 0; Huntington 2 games, Welch 1. Finals: Ashland 4 games, Huntington 1.

References

Defunct minor baseball leagues in the United States
Baseball leagues in West Virginia
Defunct professional sports leagues in the United States
Baseball leagues in Kentucky
Sports leagues established in 1937
Sports leagues disestablished in 1942